The Irish League in season 1954–55 comprised 12 teams, and Linfield won the championship.

League standings

Results

References
Northern Ireland - List of final tables (RSSSF)

NIFL Premiership seasons
1954–55 in Northern Ireland association football
North